János Hollósi (born 1923, date of death unknown) was a Hungarian rower. He competed in the men's coxless four event at the 1952 Summer Olympics.

References

External links

1923 births
Year of death missing
Hungarian male rowers
Olympic rowers of Hungary
Rowers at the 1952 Summer Olympics
Place of birth missing